Christian Meoli (born July 6, 1972 ) is an actor, writer, producer who runs Voltaire Media and film  executive.

Christian is the son of Jerry Mayo (1934–2011) bandmember of the group Freddie Bell and the Bellboys.

Early life
Christian Meoli was born on July 6, 1972 in Philadelphia and began his acting career in his early teens in regional theatre productions. He is an alumnus of the famous Stagedoor Manor and credits Jack Romano as being a constant motivator throughout his life. He graduated from Performing Arts School in Philadelphia and recipient of Outstanding Academic Scholarship to Temple University. He also appeared in dozens of plays  on the East Coast such as the Washington/Baltimore company of Tony-N-Tina's Wedding in the role of bandleader "Donny Dulce" and productions at The Philadelphia Drama Guild, Walnut Street Theatre, Plays-n-Players, Wilma Theatre, McCarter Theatre in Princeton, Surflight Summer Theatre, Paper Mill Playhouse.

In 1991, Meoli appeared opposite actor-playwright Jason Miller and Malachy McCourt in a production of Inherit The Wind that was staged in a Philadelphia court in City Hall.

Career
Meoli's first role included in the movie Alive (1993) as Federico Aranda and directed by Frank Marshall, he was next cast in the movie The Low Life (1995) together with actors Kyra Sedgwick, Rory Cochrane and Ron Livingston and also Persons Unknown (1996) with Jon Favreau, Naomi Watts and Antoni Carone.

He played the lovable and street smart comedy relief role of Boz Bishop for four seasons on the hit CBS television show Nash Bridges opposite Cheech Marin and Don Johnson. After his Mother Sandra Meoli died from Cancer, Christian created the performance event The Big C which annually plays for Cancer Survivors at Hollywood Presbyterian Medical Center. The Big C Foundation was created to continue a focus of education and outreach on the subject of Cancer.

He appeared in the pilot episode of the television show Dollhouse (directed by Joss Whedon), Martial Law (Stanley Tong) the Masterpiece Theatre PBS presentation of The Song of the Lark opposite Allison Elliot, as well as Emmy Award winning episodes of NYPD Blue, The Practice, and opposite Jack Lemmon and Hank Azaria in the acclaimed Oprah Winfrey telefilm production of Tuesdays with Morrie.

In 2003, Meoli wrote the play The Dadaists, which was lauded by The Beverly Hills Outlook as one of the five worst plays ever written. The majority of the other reviews were much more positive. The production, a retelling about the Dada art movement and Cabaret Voltaire, which originated in February 1916, in Zurich, Switzerland at Spiegelgasse 1, led Meoli to create a modern Cabaret Voltaire in Los Angeles, which showcases performers through intelligent, socially relevant events through a cross-pollination of creative energies. He is also credited by the Los Angeles Times as being the first to initiate 'flashmobs' in Los Angeles.

In 2004, Meoli was one of the co-directors and producers of the documentary Beats for Baghdad featuring Jerry Quickley.

He has produced and hosted a number of radio shows for the Pacifica Radio station KPFK, including The Hope Show, Tea Time with Harold Lemon and the Cabaret Voltaire Radio Show. In 2007, he curated "Dada, Surrealism, Readymade & Found Object Exhibit" at 2nd City Council Art Gallery and Performance Space. Christian also appeared in commercials for the likes of Volkswagen, Olympus Camera, Microsoft, Time Warner, Coors Light among others.

In 2009, Christian (under the moniker Chris Voltaire) wrote the book and lyrics, acted, produced and directed the underground theatre hit Octomom the Musical, which garnered national press via CBS, The Tonight Show, TMZ, Fox, and The New York Times with its jolting parody of the Whittier born Nadya Suleman. That same year he starred in the Victor Goss-directed film The Apocalypse According to Doris, and also became the Vice President for Marketing at Bigfoot Entertainment. The company is located in Cebu, Philippines with offices in Hong Kong and Los Angeles; among the films Meoli actively worked on include Deep Gold (2011), The Girl with No Number (2012), Midnight Movie: Killer Cut (2011), 9000 Needles (2011), as well as casting and work on reality shows produced by Bigfoot for the Fashion One Network.

He produced The Singafest Asian Film Festival in Los Angeles, which showcased 30 new films from Philippines, Taiwan, Korea, China and Japan.

Meoli's company (Voltaire Media) also expanded its services to include sales and producer representation, handling distribution acquisition for companies such as Potent Media (Deer Crossing) and American Motion Picture Company (Character).

In 2012, Meoli's company began a new single screen art house known as Arena Cinema Hollywood, which exhibiting new independent films. The endeavour in conjunction with Theatre of Arts has run engagements of Academy Award-winning films and works with distributors such as IFC, Tribeca Film, Phase 4 Films, First Run Features, Kino-Lorber, Breaking Glass Pictures, XLrator Media and Submarine.

In 2013, Meoli starred in the new film "Treachery"  opposite Michael Biehn, Sarah Butler and Caitlin Keats. He also was cast in supporting roles in the films "Dirty People" and "Soaked in Bleach."

Meoli's Voltaire Media represented Bruce Ramsay's Hamlet and the film was acquired by Breaking Glass Pictures, opening theatrically in January 2014 in New York and Los Angeles.

Filmography
Ray Donovan as Kevin (2012)
Desperate Housewives "What's the Good of Being Good" (TV Series) as himself (2012)
Should've Been Romeo as Eddie (2012)
The Girl with No Number as Mr. Johnson (2011)
Apocalypse According to Doris as Apperson (2011)
Dollhouse "Ghost" (TV Series) as Thug 1 (2009)
Eli stone "The Path" (TV Series) as Janitor (2008)
In Plain Sight "Stan" by Me (TV Series) as Jason (2008)
Everybody Hates Chris (TV Series) as himself (2008)
Life-The Fallen Woman (TV Series) as Ron (2007)
Final Approach (TV Movie) as himself (2007)
Alias(TV Series) as Semanko (2006)
JAG "Automatic for the People" (TV Series) as P.O Dave Mooney (2005)
Joan of Arcadia "The Gift"(TV Series) as Ben Pollack (2004)
The Division(TV Series) as Vinnie Praiser (2004)
Crossing Jordan "Devil May Care" (TV Series) as Seth Pale (2004)
Cold Case "Fly Away" (TV Series) as Angel Rivera (2003)
Without a Trace "The Bus" (TV Series) as Carl (2003)
Looking for Jimmy as himself (2002)
Wanderlust as Brian (2001)
Nash Bridges (TV Show) as Boz Bishop (1999–2001)
Tuesdays with Morrie (TV Movie) as Aldo (1999)
The Practice "Target Practice" (TV Series) as Charles Best (1999)
Walker, Texas Ranger "Livegirls.now" as Rolf Gaines (1999)
V.I.P. "One Wedding and Val's Funeral"(TV Series) as Waiter (1998)
The Secret Diary of Desmond Pfeiffer(TV Series) as Telegraph Operator (1998)
Martial Law " Shanghai Express"(TV Series) as Detective Jones (1998)
Hitz "Give the Drummer Some" (TV Series) as Jimmy (1997)
Bongwater as himself (1997)
Persons Unknown as himself (1996)
L.A. Firefighters "Fuel and Spark"( TV Series) as Freddy the Store Manager *(1996)
Boy Meets World "Turkey Day" (TV Series) as Carl (1996)
The Pretender "The Paper Clock" as Marcus Whittaker (1996)
Dogtown as Mickey Jenks (1996)
NYPD Blue "The Girl Talk"(TV Series) as Phil Farr (1996)
The Naked Truth (TV Series)as Vanjacker (1996)
The Low Life as Leonard (1995)
Cleghorne! "This Magic Moment" (TV Series) as Magini the Magician (1995)
Chicago Hope "Wild Cards"  (TV Series) as Luigi (1995)
Weird Science "Quantum Wyatt"(TV Series) as Dangerous Felon (1995)
Ellen "The Christmas Show" as Grunge Guy (1994)
Nunzio's Second Cousin (short) as himself (1994)
In This Corner as Julio (1994)
Beverly Hills, 90210( TV Series) as Pablo (1993)
Alive as Federico Aranda (1993)

References

External links 
 
 

1972 births
Living people
American male stage actors
21st-century American dramatists and playwrights
Male actors from Philadelphia
Temple University alumni
20th-century American male actors
21st-century American male actors